David Wulstan Myatt (born 1950) Additionally gone by the pseudonym Abdul al-Qari, is a British author, religious leader, far-right and Islamist militant, most notable for allegedly being the political and religious leader of the theistic Satanist organization Order of Nine Angles (ONA) from 1974 onwards. He is also the founder of Numinous Way and a former Muslim.

Early life

David Wulstan Myatt grew up in Tanganyika (now part of Tanzania), where his father worked as a civil servant for the British government, and later in the Far East, where he studied martial arts. He moved to England in 1967 to complete his schooling. He is reported to live in the Midlands 

According to Jeffrey Kaplan, Myatt has undertaken "a global odyssey which took him on extended stays in the Middle East and East Asia, accompanied by studies of religions ranging from Christianity to Islam in the Western tradition and Taoism and Buddhism in the Eastern path. In the course of this Siddhartha-like search for truth, Myatt sampled the life of the monastery in both its Christian and Buddhist forms."

Beliefs and career
Political scientist George Michael writes that Myatt has "arguably done more than any other theorist to develop a synthesis of the extreme right and Islam," and is "arguably England's principal proponent of contemporary neo-Nazi ideology and theoretician of revolution."

He described Myatt as an "intriguing theorist" whose "Faustian quests" not only involved studying Taoism and spending time in a Buddhist and later a Christian monastery, but also allegedly involved exploring the occult, and Paganism and what Michael calls "quasi-Satanic" secret societies, while remaining a committed National Socialist.

In 2000, British anti-fascist magazine Searchlight wrote that: "[Myatt] does not have the appearance of a Nazi ideologue ... [S]porting a long ginger beard, Barbour jacket, cords and a tweed flat cap, he resembles an eccentric country gentleman out for a Sunday ramble. But Myatt is anything but the country squire, for beneath this seemingly innocuous exterior is a man of extreme and calculated hatred. Over the past ten years, Myatt has emerged as the most ideologically driven nazi in Britain, preaching race war and terrorism [...] Myatt is believed to have been behind a 15-page document which called for race war, under the imprint White Wolves."

At a 2003 UNESCO conference in Paris, which concerned the growth of anti-Semitism, it was stated that "David Myatt, the leading hardline Nazi intellectual in Britain since the 1960s [...] has converted to Islam, praises bin Laden and al Qaeda, calls the 9/11 attacks 'acts of heroism,' and urges the killing of Jews. Myatt, under the name Abdul Aziz Ibn Myatt supports suicide missions and urges young Muslims to take up Jihad. Observers warn that Myatt is a dangerous man..." This view of Myatt as a radical Muslim, or Jihadi, is supported by Professor Robert S. Wistrich, who writes that Myatt, when a Muslim, was a staunch advocate of "Jihad, suicide missions and killing Jews..." and also "an ardent defender of bin Laden". One of Myatt's writings justifying suicide attacks was, for several years, on the Izz ad-Din al-Qassam Brigades (the military wing) section of the Hamas website.

In addition to writing about Islam and National Socialism, Myatt has translated works by Sophocles, Sappho, Aeschylus, and Homer. He has also developed a mystical philosophy which he calls The Numinous Way and invented a three-dimensional board-game, the Star Game.

Alleged involvement with occultism

Myatt is alleged to have been the founder of the occult group the Order of Nine Angles (ONA/O9A) or to have taken it over, written the publicly available teachings of the ONA under the pseudonym Anton Long, with his role being "paramount to the whole creation and existence of the ONA". According to Senholt, "ONA-inspired activities, led by protagonist David Myatt, managed to enter the scene of grand politics and the global 'War On Terror', because of several foiled terror plots in Europe that can be linked to Myatt's writings".

David Myatt has always denied such allegations about involvement with the ONA.

George Sieg expressed doubts regarding Myatt being Long, writing that he considered it to be "implausible and untenable based on the extent of variance in writing style, personality, and tone" between Myatt and Long's writings.  Jeffrey Kaplan also suggested that Myatt and Long are separate people, as did the religious studies scholar Connell R. Monette who wrote that it was quite possible that 'Anton Long' was a pseudonym used by multiple individuals over the last 30 years.

Order of Nine Angles
The Order of Nine Angles (ONA) originally was a Wiccan organization founded during the 1960s, and became a theistic Satanist organization once the leadership was allegedly taken over in 1974 by David Myatt, previously known under the pseudonym of Anton Long, a former bodyguard and supporter of the British Neo-Nazi leader Colin Jordan. In 1998, Myatt converted to radical Islam while continuing to lead the Order of Nine Angles; later on, he repudiated the Islamic religion in 2010 and publicly declared to have renounced all forms of extremism. The Order of Nine Angles identify as theistic Satanists and affirm to practice "traditional Satanism". However, the doctrine of the Order of Nine Angles is complex and multifaceted. Sociologist of religion Massimo Introvigne defined it as "a synthesis of three different currents: hermetic, pagan, and Satanist", whereas the medievalist and professor of Religious studies Connell Monette dismissed the Satanic features of the ONA as "cosmetic" and contended that "its core mythos and cosmology are genuinely hermetic". According to the scholar of Western esotericism Nicholas Goodrick-Clarke, "the ONA celebrated the dark, destructive side of life through anti-Christian, elitist, and Social Darwinist doctrines", together with the organization's implicit ties to Neo-Nazism and the appraisal of National Socialism. The Order of Nine Angles believe that the seven planets and their satellites are connected to the "Dark Gods", while Satan is considered to be one of two "actual entities", the other one being Baphomet, with the former conceived as male and the latter as female. The organization became controversial and was mentioned in the press and books because of their promotion of human sacrifice. Since the 2010s, the political ideology and religious worldview of the Order of Nine Angles have increasingly influenced militant neo-fascist and Neo-Nazi insurgent groups associated with right-wing extremist and White supremacist international networks, most notably the Iron March forum.

The counter-terrorism author Jon B. Perdue describes Myatt as "[a] British iconoclast who has lived a somewhat itinerant life and has undertaken an equally desultory intellectual quest” and is "emblematic of the modern syncretism of radical ideologies". Myatt is regarded as an "example of the axis between right-wing extremists and Islamists", and has been described as an "extremely violent, intelligent, dark, and complex individual"; as a martial arts expert; as one of the more interesting figures on the British neo-Nazi scene since the 1970s, and as a key Al-Qaeda propagandist. According to Daniel Koehler of the International Centre for Counter-Terrorism, Myatt "is a complex persona who defies simple answers to the question of why he changed groups and milieus so often and so fundamentally. It is also obvious, that during large parts of his life, Myatt was driven by a search for meaning and purpose."

Before his conversion to Islam in 1998, Myatt was the first leader of the British National Socialist Movement (NSM), and was identified by The Observer, as the "ideological heavyweight" behind Combat 18.

Myatt came to public attention in 1999, a year after his Islamic conversion, when a pamphlet he allegedly wrote many years earlier, A Practical Guide to Aryan Revolution, described as a "detailed step-by-step guide for terrorist insurrection", was said to have inspired David Copeland, who left nailbombs in areas frequented by London's black, South Asian, and gay communities. Three people died and 129 were injured in the explosions, several of them losing limbs. It has also been suggested that Myatt's A Practical Guide to Aryan Revolution might have influenced the German National Socialist Underground.

In 2021 The Counter Extremism Project listed Myatt as one of the world's 20 most dangerous extremists.

Political activism
Myatt joined Colin Jordan's British Movement, a neo-Nazi group, in 1968, where he sometimes acted as Jordan's bodyguard at meetings and rallies. Myatt would later become Leeds Branch Secretary and a member of British Movement's National Council. From the 1970s until the 1990s, he remained involved with paramilitary and neo-Nazi organisations such as Column 88 and Combat 18, and was imprisoned twice for violent offences in connection with his political activism.

Myatt was the founder and first leader of the National Socialist Movement of which David Copeland was a member. He also co-founded, with Eddy Morrison, the neo-Nazi organization the NDFM (National Democratic Freedom Movement) which was active in Leeds, England, in the early 1970s, and the neo-Nazi Reichsfolk group, and which Reichsfolk organization "aimed to create a new Aryan elite, The Legion of Adolf Hitler, and so prepare the way for a golden age in place of 'the disgusting, decadent present with its dishonourable values and dis-honourable weak individuals'".

Of the NDFM, John Tyndall wrote (in a polemic against NDFM co-founder Eddy Morrison): "The National Democratic Freedom Movement made little attempt to engage in serious politics but concentrated its activities mainly upon acts of violence against its opponents. [...] Before very long the NDFM had degenerated into nothing more than a criminal gang."

It is also alleged that in the early 1980s Myatt tried to establish a Nazi-occultist commune in Shropshire, and which project was advertised in Colin Jordan's Gothic Ripples newsletter, with Goodrick-Clark writing that "after marrying and settling in Church Stretton in Shropshire, [Myatt] attempted in 1983 to set up a rural commune within the framework of Colin Jordan's Vanguard Project for neo-nazi utopias publicized in Gothic Ripples".

Michael writes that Myatt took over the leadership of Combat 18 in 1998, when Charlie Sargent, the previous leader, was jailed for murder.

Alleged influence on David Copeland

In November 1997, Myatt allegedly posted a racist and anti-Semitic pamphlet he had written called Practical Guide to Aryan Revolution on a website based in British Columbia, Canada by Bernard Klatt. The pamphlet included chapter titles such as "Assassination", "Terror Bombing", and "Racial War". According to Michael Whine of the Board of Deputies of British Jews, "[t]he contents provided a detailed step-by-step guide for terrorist insurrection with advice on assassination targets, rationale for bombing and sabotage campaigns, and rules of engagement."

In February 1998, detectives from S012 Scotland Yard raided Myatt's home in Worcestershire and removed his computers and files. He was arrested on suspicion of incitement to murder and incitement to racial hatred, but the case later dropped, after a three-year investigation, because the evidence supplied by the Canadian authorities was not enough to secure a conviction.

It was a copy of the Practical Guide to Aryan Revolution pamphlet that, in 1999, was discovered by police in the flat of David Copeland, the London nailbomber – who was also a member of Myatt's National Socialist Movement – and thus which allegedly influenced him to plant homemade bombs targeting immigrants in Brixton, Brick Lane, and inside the Admiral Duncan pub on Old Compton Street in London, frequented by the black, Asian, and gay communities respectively. Friends John Light, Nick Moore, and Andrea Dykes and her unborn child died in the Admiral Duncan pub. Copeland told police he had been trying to spark a "racial war."

Following the conviction of Copeland for murder on 30 June 2000, after a trial at the Old Bailey, one newspaper wrote of Myatt: "This is the man who shaped mind of a bomber; Cycling the lanes around Malvern, the mentor who drove David Copeland to kill [...] Riding a bicycle around his Worcestershire home town sporting a wizard-like beard and quirky dress-sense, the former monk could easily pass as a country eccentric or off-beat intellectual. But behind David Myatt's studious exterior lies a more sinister character that has been at the forefront of extreme right-wing ideology in Britain since the mid-1960s."

According to the BBC's Panorama, in 1998 when Myatt was leader of the NSM, he called for "the creation of racial terror with bombs".<ref
name="panorama" /> Myatt is also quoted by Searchlight as having stated that "[t]he primary duty of all National Socialists is to change the world. National Socialism means revolution: the overthrow of the existing System and its replacement with a National-Socialist society. Revolution means struggle: it means war. It means certain tactics have to be employed, and a great revolutionary movement organised which is primarily composed of those prepared to fight, prepared to get their hands dirty and perhaps spill some blood".

Conversion to Islam
Myatt converted to Islam in 1998. He told Professor George Michael that his decision to convert began when he took a job on a farm in England. He was working long hours in the fields and felt an affinity with nature, concluding that the sense of harmony he felt had not come about by chance. He told Michael that he was also impressed by the militancy of Islamist groups, and believed that he shared common enemies with Islam, namely "the capitalist-consumer West and international finance."

While, initially, some critics, specifically the anti-fascist Searchlight organization, suggested that Myatt's conversion "may be just a political ploy to advance his own failing anti-establishment agenda", it is now generally accepted that his conversion was genuine.

As a Muslim, he travelled and spoke in several Arab countries, and wrote one of the most detailed defenses in the English language of Islamic suicide attacks. He also expressed support for the Taliban, and referred to the Holocaust as a "hoax". An April 2005 NATO workshop heard that Myatt had called on "all enemies of the Zionists to embrace the Jihad" against Jews and the United States.

According to an article in The Times published on 24 April 2006, Myatt then believed that: "The pure authentic Islam of the revival, which recognises practical jihad as a duty, is the only force that is capable of fighting and destroying the dishonour, the arrogance, the materialism of the West ... For the West, nothing is sacred, except perhaps Zionists, Zionism, the hoax of the so-called Holocaust, and the idols which the West and its lackeys worship, or pretend to worship, such as democracy... Jihad is our duty. If nationalists, or some of them, desire to aid us, to help us, they can do the right thing, the honourable thing, and convert, revert, to Islam — accepting the superiority of Islam over and above each and every way of the West."

Departure from Islam
In 2010, Myatt publicly announced that he had rejected both Islam  and extremism.

Notes

References

Barnett, Antony. "Right here, right now", The Observer, February 9, 2003
BBC Panorama. "The Nailbomber", broadcast June 30, 2000
BBC Panorama. "The Nailbomber" transcript
Gary Daher Canedo: Safo y Catulo: poesía amorosa de la antigüedad, Universidad Nur, 2005
Goodrick-Clark, N. (2001) Black Sun: Aryan Cults, Esoteric Nazism and the Politics of Identity. 
Karmon, Ely. "Arenas for Radical and Anti-Globalization Groups Activity" , NATO Workshop On Terrorism and Communications, Slovakia, April 2005
Lowles, N. (2001) White Riot: The Violent Story of Combat 18. Milo Books, England; this edition 2003 
Michael, George. (2006) The Enemy of My Enemy: The Alarming Convergence of Militant Islam and the Extreme Right. University Press of Kansas
Tel Aviv University. "Anti-Semitism Worldwide 1998/9 United Kingdom", retrieved August 17, 2005
Woolcock, Nicola & and Kennedy, Dominic. "What the Neo Nazi Fanatic Did Next: Switched to Islam" The Times April 24, 2006

Further reading

Goodrick-Clarke, Nicholas. (2001) Black Sun: Aryan Cults, Esoteric Nazism and the Politics of Identity. New York University Press   (Paperback)
Kaplan, J. (1998) "Religiosity and the Radical Right: Toward the Creation of a New Ethnic Identity" in Kaplan and Tore Bjørgo (eds.) Nation and Race: The Developing Euro-American Racist Subculture, Northeastern University Press, 1998, .
Kaplan, J. (ed) (2000) Encyclopedia of White Power: A Sourcebook on the Radical Racist Right. Rowman & Littlefield Pub Inc., 2000; AltaMira Press.  pp. 216ff; pp. 235ff; pp. 512ff
Lowles, Nick. (2003) White Riot: The Violent Story of Combat 18. Milo Books 
McLagan, Graeme. (2003) Killer on the Streets. John Blake Publishing. 
Michael, George. (2006) The Enemy of My Enemy: The Alarming Convergence of Militant Islam and the Extreme Right. University Press of Kansas
Ryan, Nick. (2003) Homeland: Into A World of Hate. Mainstream Publishing Company Ltd. 
Sołtysiak, Arkadiusz. Neopogaństwo i neonazizm: Kilka słów o ideologiach Davida Myatta i Varga Vikernesa. Antropologia Religii. Wybór esejów. Tom IV, (2010), s. 173-182
Weitzman, Mark: Antisemitismus und Holocaust-Leugnung: Permanente Elemente des globalen Rechtsextremismus, in Thomas Greven: Globalisierter Rechtsextremismus? Die extremistische Rechte in der Ära der Globalisierung. 1 Auflage. VS Verlag für Sozialwissenschaften/GWV Fachverlage GmbH, Wiesbaden 2006, 

1950 births
Antisemitism in the United Kingdom
British former Muslims
Critics of Islamism
British Holocaust deniers
English Islamists
English neo-Nazis
Islamism in the United Kingdom
Living people
Neo-Nazism in the United Kingdom
Neo-Nazism in Europe
Terrorism in the United Kingdom
Satanism and Nazism
Tanzanian emigrants to the United Kingdom
Tanzanian people of English descent